Miklukho-Maklai, is a 1947 Soviet drama film directed by Aleksandr Razumny.

Plot 
The film tells about the famous Russian ethnographer Nicholas Miklouho-Maclay and his travels to Australia and Oceania, where he watched the natives.

Starring 
 Sergei Kurilov as Nikolai Miklukho-Maklaj (as S. Kurilov)
 Galina Grigoreva as Margaret Robertson (as G. Grigoryeva)
 Mikhail Astangov as Dr. Brandler (as M. Astangov)
 Aleksey Maksimov as Robertson (as A. Maksimov)
 Georgiy Budarov as Thompson (as G. Budarov)
 Valentina Kuindzhi as Lawrence (as V. Kuindzhi)
 Weyland Rodd as Chief Oor (as Veiland Rod)
 Lev Fenin as Governor (as L. Fenin)
 Jim Komogorov as African Boy (as Dzhim Komogorov)
 Emmanuil Geller as Kafa (as E. Geller)
 Robert Robinson as Malu
 Arkadi Arkadyev 
 I. Bragintseva
 
 Aleksey Zubov
 V. Keropyan
 V. Makovejsky	
 Leonid Pirogov
 V. Poletimsky
 P. Orlovsky
 A. Savelyev

References

External links 
 

1947 films
1940s Russian-language films
Soviet black-and-white films
Soviet adventure drama films
1940s adventure drama films
1947 drama films